Gerald Veasley (born July 28, 1955) is an American jazz bass guitarist.

Veasley was born and raised in Philadelphia, Pennsylvania, where he played in R&B groups as a teenager. He worked with Joe Zawinul from 1988 to 1995, and began releasing his own records in 1992. He has also done extensive work as a studio musician. His 2008 release Your Move hit No. 12 on the U.S. Billboard Top Contemporary Jazz Albums chart. Veasley has also worked as a smooth jazz DJ on WJJZ in Philadelphia.

Bass Bootcamp
In 2002 Veasley founded his own Bass Bootcamp in Philadelphia with Roxanne Veasley and Lee Patterson. The camp has served over 700 bass players from all around world as well as other professionals like Marcus Miller, Stanley Clarke, Michael Manring, Victor Wooten, and many more. The camp lasts for 2 days and students are taught many important musical skills by the instructors such as:learning how to groove, creating bass lines, improving your ear, optimizing practice time, and playing live with a drummer. In addition, they also teach under music theory topics like covering scales, arpeggios, modes, etc.,as well as an “All-Star Concert” which takes place at The Ardmore Music Hall featuring Gerald and various special guests.

Collaborations

In 1988, Gerald joined a jazz fusion band called The Zawinul Syndicate featuring keyboardist Joe Zawinul, former member of the group Weather Report. The band blended the styles from many different cultures of music and combined tones of strange grooves, driving, swinging and toured from places like the U.S to Germany and continued on until the unfortunate death of Joe.

In June of 1999, Gerald was featured playing bass on an album with Philip Bailey called “Dreams”. The album featured many artists such as George Duke, Marcus Miller, Pat Metheny, Gerald Albright, and many others. Veasley was featured on the song “Something To Remind You” with Duke and Metheny.

On April 1, 2008, Gerald was invited on stage as a guest with Victor Wooten, along with Anthony Wellington at The Keswick Theatre in Glenside, PA

In 2019, Veasley was invited to Ridley Park, Pennsylvania to play at Ridley High School at their yearly “Jazz Night”. The night featured 3 performances done by Ridley Elementary, Middle School, and High School Jazz band with Veasley playing with each group, as well as the high school acappella group; Rhapsody. The middle school performance featured 4 of the 6 members of the Philadelphia jamband “Refrigerator” DJ Callahan on Drums, Cole Steiner on Auxiliary Percussion, James McKinney on Baritone Saxophone, and Jeremy Leafey on Bass Guitar who Gerald ended up having a bass duet with on their opening song.

Discography

As leader
 One Minute of Love (Gramavision, 1985)
 Look Ahead (Heads Up, 1992)
 Signs (Heads Up, 1994)
 Soul Control (Inak, 1997)
 Love Letters (Inak, 1999)
 On the Fast Track (Heads Up, 2001)
 Velvet (Heads Up, 2002)
 At the Jazz Base! (Heads Up, 2005)
 Your Move (Heads Up, 2008)
 Electric Mingus Project (Fanwave, 2011)

As sideman
With John Blake
 Twinkling of an Eye (Gramavision, 1985)
 Adventures of the Heart (Gramavision, 1987)
 A New Beginning (Gramavision, 1988)

With Odean Pope
 Almost Like Me (Moers Music, 1982)
 The Saxophone Shop (Soul Note, 1986)
 Out for a Walk (Moers Music, 1990)
 The Ponderer (Soul Note, 1991)
 Epitome (Soul Note, 1994)

With Special EFX
 Global Village (GRP, 1992)
 Play (JVC, 1993)
 Here to Stay (JVC, 1997)

With Grover Washington Jr.
 Strawberry Moon (Columbia, 1987)
 Then and Now (CBS, 1988)
 Time Out of Mind (Columbia, 1989)
 Next Exit (CBS/Sony, 1992)
 Soulful Strut (Columbia, 1996)
 Breath of Heaven (Columbia, 1997)

With others
 Chuck Anderson, Angel Blue (Anderson Music, 2002)
 Philip Bailey, Dreams (Heads Up, 1999)
 Jimmy Bruno, Midnight Blue (Concord Jazz, 2001)
 Suzanne Cloud, With a Little Help from My Friends (Dreambox, 2014)
 The Dixie Hummingbirds, Live in Philadelphia (Gospel AIR & Tapes, 1987)
 Nnenna Freelon, Tales of Wonder (Concord Jazz, 2002)
 George Jinda, Reliable Sources (JVC, 1991)
 George Jinda, George Jinda and World News (JVC, 1992)
 B.B. King, Here & There: the Uncollected B.B. King (Hip-O, 2001)
 Chuck Loeb, Between 2 Worlds (Heads Up, 2009)
 Bobby Lyle, The Journey (Atlantic, 1990)
 Jason Miles, To Grover with Love/Live in Japan (Whaling City Sound, 2016)
 Jaco Pastorius, Word of Mouth Revisited (Heads Up, 2003)
 Teddy Pendergrass, A Little More Magic (Elektra, 1993)
 Kim Pensyl, Eyes of Wonder (GRP, 1993)
 Phil Perry, The Heart of the Man (Capitol, 1991)
 Pieces of a Dream, Love's Silhouette (Heads Up, 2002)
 Harry Sokal, Voices of Time (Universal, 2005)
 Jamaaladeen Tacuma, The Night of Chamber Music (Moers Music, 1993)
 Jamaaladeen Tacuma, All Basses Covered (Moers Music, 2005)
 Mark Wood, Voodoo Violince (Guitar, 1991)
 Zawinul Syndicate, Black Water (Columbia, 1989)
 Zawinul Syndicate, Lost Tribes (Columbia, 1992)

References

External links
Official website

Interview with Gerald Veasley - Part one, 10/01/2007
Interview with Gerald Veasley - Part Two, 12/01/2007

American jazz bass guitarists
American session musicians
Smooth jazz bass guitarists
Living people
1955 births
Heads Up International artists
Guitarists from Philadelphia
American male bass guitarists
20th-century American bass guitarists
Jazz musicians from Pennsylvania
20th-century American male musicians
American male jazz musicians
The Zawinul Syndicate members